Corry is a surname. Notable people with the surname include:

Armar Lowry Corry (1793–1855), British rear admiral and veteran of the Crimean War
Charles Corry (born 1940), Irish former cricketer
Eoghan Corry (born 1961), Irish columnist, travel writer and author of sports history
Isaac Corry (1753–1813), Irish and British Member of Parliament and lawyer
James Corry (disambiguation)
Joel Corry (born 1989), British DJ, producer and television personality
John Corry (1667–1726), Irish politician
John Corry (writer), Irish topographer and historian
Leo Corry (born 1956), Israeli historian
Martin Corry (politician) (1890–1979), Irish politician, Fianna Fáil Teachta Dála (TD) from Cork 1927–1969
Martin Corry (rugby union) (born 1973), English rugby union footballer
Maurice Corry (born 1950), Scottish politician
Montagu Corry, 1st Baron Rowton (1838–1903), British philanthropist and public servant, longtime private secretary to Benjamin Disraeli
Paul Corry (born 1991), Irish retired footballer
Peter Corry (born 1966) Northern Irish singer
Ron Corry (born 1941), Australian former football goalkeeper and coach
Stephen Corry (born 1951), British anthropologist and Director of the British indigenous rights organisation Survival International
Thomas Hughes Corry (1859–1883), British botanist
Trevor Corry (1724–1780), Irish-born merchant and British diplomat
William M. Corry Jr. (1889–1920), US Navy officer posthumously awarded the Medal of Honor
William Corry (Cincinnati mayor) (1779–1833), American politician
William Corry, 2nd Baronet (1859–1926), of the Corry baronets
William James Corry, 4th Baronet (1924–2000), of the Corry baronets

See also

Carry (name)